Kiara Shaelene "Kiki" Pickett (born April 30, 1999) is an American professional soccer player who plays for North Carolina Courage in the National Women's Soccer League. She was drafted fourth overall in the 2021 NWSL Draft by Kansas City, who sent $175,000 in allocation money to Sky Blue FC (since renamed NJ/NY Gotham FC) in exchange for the draft pick.

Career
Pickett played collegiately at Stanford University, where she helped the Cardinal win the Women's College Cup in 2017 and 2019. At the 2019 title game, she scored the winning penalty in the shootout against North Carolina. In April 2021, Pickett was named Pac-12 Conference Defensive Player of the Year for the 2020 season.

On May 18, 2021, Pickett signed a 3-year contract with Kansas City. She made her professional debut on June 26, 2021, coming on as a substitute in a 1–2 loss to the Washington Spirit.

References

External links
Stanford Cardinal profile

1999 births
Living people
American women's soccer players
African-American women's soccer players
Soccer players from California
Sportspeople from Santa Barbara, California
United States women's under-20 international soccer players
Women's association football defenders
Stanford Cardinal women's soccer players
Kansas City Current players
Kansas City Current draft picks
21st-century African-American sportspeople
National Women's Soccer League players
21st-century African-American women
North Carolina Courage players